Sword in the Desert is a 1949 American war film directed by George Sherman. It was the first American film to deal with the 1947–1948 Civil War in Mandatory Palestine and marked the first significant feature film role for Jeff Chandler.

Plot
Freighter owner and captain Mike Dillon reluctantly smuggles Jewish immigrants into Palestine, making it very clear to the Jewish leader, David Vogel, he is only doing it for the money. Dillon is annoyed to learn that he will have to go ashore to get paid the eight thousand U.S. dollars he is owed. When a British patrol boat arrives sooner than expected, Dillon is forced to join the Jews in their flight for freedom. There are casualties on both sides before the refugees get away, including one of Dillon's men.

Cast

Production
The screenplay was based on a short story by Robert Buckner, who came up with the idea after a visit to Palestine in 1934. Bucker later expanded this into a short story about Christmas in Palestine as experienced by a visiting American. In the 1940s he expanded this into a novel, then a screenplay, originally called Night Watch, then later Desert Legion.

Dick Powell had been considered for the role of the American, then Stephen McNally was chosen to play the American pilot, while Paul Christian was to play a Palestinian Jewish leader. However, when Christian had to drop out due to an eye infection, McNally took over his role, and Dana Andrews played McNally's part. Ann Blyth was intended to play the female lead. Bucker was originally announced as director, but George Sherman took over that task. Blyth was reassigned by Universal to Once More, My Darling and the female lead given instead to Märta Torén.

Jeff Chandler was cast in February 1949. The role was originally intended for an older actor but was reconfigured once Chandler was cast.

Production took place on Universal's backlot with location work at Monterey, California, the San Fernando Valley and Victorville in the Mojave Desert.

Even during filming, there was an expectation that the film would be controversial because it showed Jewish settlers fighting the British and not Arabs. Universal barred reporters from the set during the last week of filming because several London papers had carried adverse articles on the project.

Controversy on release in Britain and Australia
The Evening Standard claimed that the film was "not for the eyes of Britons" and the Daily Telegraph insisted that British audiences would be surprised to see the unwonted harshness with which the British troops in the film treated Jewish civilians. There were demonstrations and disturbances outside the New Gallery cinema,  near Piccadilly in London, when the film opened there on 2 February 1950, and pamphlets supporting Oswald Mosley's fascist Union Movement were distributed to people wanting to see it. The cinema also received a bomb threat. Mosley threatened to picket other cinemas that showed the film.

Five days later, the Public Control Committee of London Country Council followed the advice of the Home Office and prohibited further public showings of the film in order to prevent further scenes of rowdiness by fascist elements. It ignored a protest from the National Council for Civil Liberties, which claimed that its action constituted a ban on free speech.

The film was screened in Australia after some cuts, but was not shown in Tasmania because of its controversial content.

References

External links
 
 
 
 
 Review of film at Variety

1949 films
1940s English-language films
Universal Pictures films
American black-and-white films
Films directed by George Sherman
Films set in Mandatory Palestine
Films scored by Frank Skinner
1940s war drama films
American war drama films
1949 drama films
Censored films
Films based on short fiction
1940s American films